Sabarna Roy Choudhury was a Zamindar family of Mughal Bengal. They controlled significant swathes of territory, including what would later become Kolkata, prior to the sale of zamindari rights in 1698 to the East India Company.

Zamindari

Establishment Legends 
Family tradition holds that one ascetic of Benaras—Kamdev Brahmachari, born Jia Ganguly and the only heir of Panchu Ganguly "Khan"—had Man Singh I among his disciples. Kamdev had not only taught him all the tricks of war but also provided tactical knowledge about quelling Pratapaditya of Bengal, a rebel vassal.

In the meanwhile, Jia's son, Lakshmikanta Ganguly, who was deserted at his birth, had become the Chief Revenue Officer of Pratapaditya. Mansingh had him switch sides before subduing the rebellion c. 1613. In return, the zamindari rights of multiple parganas including but not limited to the three villages of Sutanuti, Govindapur and Dihi Kalikata were granted to him, who went on to adopt the surname of Roy Choudhury. The Gangulys are held to be the traditional patrons (and worshipers) of the Kalighat Kali and thus, the particular choice of lands. These territories were still owned by the Mughal emperor but the right to governance and tax-collection, a major part of which was to be remitted to the Mughal Court, was ceded away with.

Historical accuracy 
Man Singh I had never waged any war against Pratapaditya and the background story about the receipt of grant appears to be fictional. The factual authenticity of Roy Chowdhurys' being the traditional patrons of the deity is disputed. Notwithstanding the unclear circumstances governing their rise to the elite strata, they were one of the first Brahmin families of would-be Calcutta. However, by then, Sutanuti was already a major wool-trading center where had flourished the Bysacks, Seths, and a group of Portuguese merchants. In Calcutta itself, Armenian traders had set foot and commanded significant influence.

Relinquishment 
Around early March 1698, the East India Company (EIC) proposed that the Choudhury have them sub-rent Dihi Kalikata. The offer was rejected since Choudhury saw a chance of permanently losing the properties to a far-powerful client. This led the EIC to negotiate for the rent-rights at the Mughal quarters outright and one Nathaniel Walsh was dispatched to Prince Azim-ush-Shan, then-Viceroy of Bengal Subah.

The negotiations proved successful. On 14 April, Walsh informed the Court about the Prince confirming an informal grant of Zamindari rights. Only around early July, the nishaan would be signed by the Diwan and sent to the Prince; the reason for delay being the multiple complains lodged by Choudhury who was ultimately granted a compensation of 1000 Rupees by Azim-ush-Shan, of which half had to be borne by the Company. Around early July, the Choudhury made another last-ditch effort at stalling the transfer by promising a sum of 6000 Rupees to the Prince but failed. On 14 July two copies of Nishaan were received but on 22 July, it was asked of Welsh to get them stamped by the Qadi; on 1 August, three appropriately-stamped copies of nishaans were finally received. The zamindari rights, not only for Dihi Kalikata but also for Sutanuti and Govindapur, had been transferred to the Company but subsequent to them paying the Choudhury another 1000 Rupees.  

The company started execution of the transfer in around October. Despite the nishaans and presence of Mughal officials, the Choudhury proved unwilling to part with the lands and even threatened to complaint Aurangzeb about Azim-ush-Shan's ways. So, the Company proposed to pay them an additional 500 Rupees, if they consented in writing about relinquishing all claims to the lands permanently. On 9 November 1698, the bainama (sale/transfer-deed) was finally executed in tune with what the Company sought; the Choudhury had sold all of their rights to Charles Eyre for a renegotiated sum of 1300 Rupees.

On 3 February 1699, Diwan Izzat Khan issued a parwana declaring the sale deed to be operative; thenceforth, the Mughals were to recognize the Company as the permanent taluqdars. The Choudhury moved to Barisha soon after the sale. This pioneer purchase of zamindari will remain a keystone for the British ascendency in South Asia; the three villages will gradually merge with each other (and other adjacent territories) under the Company administration, to form the modern town of Calcutta.

Analysis 
The sale proved to be a deviation; prior, the Mughals had seldom bothered with negotiating the sale of zamindaris and usually gave the involved tax-farmers a free hand. This is popularly attributed to the Company's showering of a variety of gifts on Azim-ush-Shan as well as his relatives and officials. However, the gifts or token sums are not perceptible as bribes — being mostly in the form of nazrana or peshkash — and they were anyway too meager for the concessions decreed.

Durga Puja 
The Sabarna Roy Choudhurys were one of the earliest to hold the public festival of Durga Puja — apparently, in 1610.

Museum 
Sabarna Sangrahashala, a heritage museum in Kolkata is run by the family.

Notes

References 

History of Kolkata
Bengali zamindars